Sara Marie Nicholls (born 16 October 1989) is a Welsh international lawn and indoor bowler.

Bowls career

In 2022, she competed in the women's pairs and the Women's fours at the 2022 Commonwealth Games.

References

Welsh female bowls players
Living people
1989 births
Bowls players at the 2022 Commonwealth Games